Texmaker is a cross-platform open-source LaTeX editor with an integrated PDF viewer. It is entirely a Qt app. Texmaker supports Linux, macOS and Windows systems and integrates many tools needed to develop documents with LaTeX.

Features 
The editor includes full Unicode support, inline spell checking, auto-completion, code folding and rectangular block selection. Regular expressions are also supported for the find-and-replace actions.

Texmaker includes wizards for the following tasks:
 Generate a new document or a letter or a tabular environment.
 Create tables, tabulars, figure environments, and so forth.
 Export a LaTeX document via TeX4ht (HTML or ODT format).

Some of the LaTeX tags and mathematical symbols can be inserted in one click and users can define an unlimited number of snippets with keyboard triggers.

Texmaker automatically locates errors and warnings detected in the log file after a compilation.

The integrated PDF viewer supports continuous, rotation and presentation mode. Direct and reverse synchronization between source TeX files and the resulting PDF file is supported via the SyncTeX support.

The Asymptote graphics language is also fully supported by Texmaker (for both editing and compilation).

See also 

 Comparison of TeX editors

References

External links 

Texmaker website
OpenOffice.Org dictionaries
LaTeX-Community - Texmaker

Free TeX editors
Linux TeX software
TeX editors that use Qt